Claire Faber (born 21 June 1998) is a Luxembourgian racing cyclist, who currently rides for UCI Women's Continental Team . She rode in the women's road race event at the 2017 UCI Road World Championships.

For the 2021 season, Faber was initially due to be part of Team Rupelcleaning for their first season at UCI level, having been part of the team in 2020 when they were competing domestically as Illi-Bikes.

References

External links

1998 births
Living people
Luxembourgian female cyclists
Place of birth missing (living people)
European Games competitors for Luxembourg
Cyclists at the 2019 European Games